The St. John’s University men's lacrosse team represents St. John's University in National Collegiate Athletic Association (NCAA) Division I college lacrosse. The program was created in 1981 and plays its home games at DaSilva Memorial Field, which has a capacity of 1,200. The Red Storm have competed in the Big East men's lacrosse conference since 2010, previously competing in the ECAC Lacrosse League. Through 2019, the team has an all–time record of 170-238.

In 2012, the Red Storm had arguably their best season since being revived as a program in 2005. St. John’s made its lone appearance to date in the Big East Conference men’s lacrosse tournament, defeating Notre Dame to reach the finals. The team faced Syracuse in the championship game, but were throttled 12-4 and denied their first ever NCAA Division I Men's Lacrosse Championship appearance.

Season Results
The following is a list of the Red Storm’s seasons results as an NCAA Division I program:

{| class="wikitable"

|- align="center"

†NCAA canceled 2020 collegiate activities due to the COVID-19 virus.

References

External links

College men's lacrosse teams in the United States
Big East Conference men's lacrosse
1981 establishments in New York City
Lacrosse clubs established in 1981